McNeeley Peak is a 6,786-foot-elevation (2,068 m) summit located in Mount Rainier National Park in Pierce County of Washington state. It is part of the Sourdough Mountains, a subset of the Cascade Range. McNeeley Peak is situated north of the Sunrise Historic District, east of Mount Fremont, and northwest of Antler Peak. The peak was named in 1932 for Edwin J. McNeeley (born 1858), a prominent Tacoma businessman.  Access is limited by snow closing the Sunrise Road much of the year. July, August, and September are typically the months when the Sunrise Road is seasonally open for vehicle traffic. Precipitation runoff from McNeeley Peak drains into the White River.

Climate
McNeeley Peak is located in the marine west coast climate zone of western North America. Most weather fronts originate in the Pacific Ocean, and travel northeast toward the Cascade Mountains. As fronts approach, they are forced upward by the peaks of the Cascade Range (Orographic lift), causing them to drop their moisture in the form of rain or snowfall onto the Cascades. As a result, the west side of the Cascades experiences high precipitation, especially during the winter months in the form of snowfall. During winter months, weather is usually cloudy, but, due to high pressure systems over the Pacific Ocean that intensify during summer months, there is often little or no cloud cover during the summer. Because of maritime influence, snow tends to be wet and heavy, resulting in high avalanche danger. The months July through September offer the most favorable weather for viewing or climbing this peak.

Gallery

See also

 Geography of Washington (state)
 Geology of the Pacific Northwest

References

External links
 National Park Service web site: Mount Rainier National Park
 Weather: McNeeley Peak

Cascade Range
Mountains of Pierce County, Washington
Mountains of Washington (state)
Mount Rainier National Park
North American 2000 m summits